745 Naval Air Squadron (745 NAS) was a Naval Air Squadron of the Royal Navy's Fleet Air Arm. It was initially active from 1943 to 1945 as a Telegraphist Air Gunner Training squadron, part of No.2 Telegraphist Air Gunner School based at R.N. Air Section Yarmouth, Nova Scotia, Canada.

History of 745 NAS

Telegraphist Air Gunner Training Squadron (1943 - 1945)
745 Naval Air Squadron formed at R.N. Air Section Yarmouth, Nova Scotia, Canada, as a Telegraphist Air Gunner Training Squadron, on the 1 March 1943. It was part of No.2 Telegraphist Air Gunner School, within the Royal Navy No.1 Naval Air Gunnery School (NAGS), which was under the British Commonwealth Air Training Plan.

References

Citations

Bibliography

700 series Fleet Air Arm squadrons
Military units and formations established in 1943
Military units and formations of the Royal Navy in World War II